39–41 Lower Fort Street, Millers Point is a heritage-listed former terrace house and now mixed use  located at 39–41 Lower Fort Street, in the inner city Sydney suburb of Millers Point in the City of Sydney local government area of New South Wales, Australia. It is also known as Georgian Townhouse. It was added to the New South Wales State Heritage Register on 2 April 1999.

Description 
The building is a terrace house with three storeys and a basement level which is at the level of the lower rear lane.

Heritage listing 
39–41 Lower Fort Street, Millers Point was listed on the New South Wales State Heritage Register on 2 April 1999.

See also 

Australian residential architectural styles
Linsley Terrace, 25-35 Lower Fort Street
47-53 Lower Fort Street

References

Attribution

External links

 
 

New South Wales State Heritage Register sites located in Millers Point
Lower Fort Street, Millers Point, 39-41
Terraced houses in Sydney
Articles incorporating text from the New South Wales State Heritage Register
Georgian Revival architecture in Australia